The following is a partial list of the "E" codes for Medical Subject Headings (MeSH), as defined by the United States National Library of Medicine (NLM).

This list continues the information at List of MeSH codes (E01). Codes following these are found at List of MeSH codes (E03). For other MeSH codes, see List of MeSH codes.

The source for this content is the set of 2006 MeSH Trees from the NLM.

– therapeutics

– acoustic stimulation

– balneology

– ammotherapy

– baths

– mud therapy

– steam bath

– bed rest

– behavior control

– restraint, physical

– biological therapy

– blood patch, epidural

– blood transfusion
  – blood component transfusion
  – erythrocyte transfusion
  – leukocyte transfusion
  – lymphocyte transfusion
  – platelet transfusion
  – blood transfusion, autologous
  – blood transfusion, intrauterine
  – exchange transfusion, whole blood
  – plasma exchange

– cytapheresis
  – leukapheresis
  – plateletpheresis

– gene therapy

– hematopoietic stem cell mobilization

– immunotherapy
  – immunization
  – immunization, passive
  – adoptive transfer
  – immunotherapy, adoptive
  – immunization schedule
  – immunization, secondary
  – immunotherapy, active
  – vaccination
  – mass immunization
  – immunosuppression
  – desensitization, immunologic
  – graft enhancement, immunologic
  – lymphocyte depletion
  – transplantation conditioning
  – radioimmunotherapy

– oncolytic virotherapy

– organotherapy
  – tissue therapy

– blood component removal

– bone marrow purging

– cytapheresis
  – leukapheresis
  – plateletpheresis

– leukocyte reduction procedures
  – leukapheresis

– plasmapheresis

– cardiac pacing, artificial

– catheterization

– angioplasty
  – angioplasty, balloon
  – angioplasty, balloon, laser-assisted
  – angioplasty, transluminal, percutaneous coronary
  – angioplasty, laser
  – angioplasty, balloon, laser-assisted
  – atherectomy
  – atherectomy, coronary

– balloon dilatation
  – angioplasty, balloon
  – angioplasty, balloon, laser-assisted
  – angioplasty, transluminal, percutaneous coronary

– balloon occlusion

– catheter ablation

– catheterization, central venous

– catheterization, peripheral
  – catheterization, swan-ganz

– heart catheterization
  – catheter ablation
  – catheterization, swan-ganz

– radiography, interventional

– urinary catheterization

– cautery

– electrocoagulation
  – catheter ablation

– clinical protocols

– antineoplastic protocols
  – antineoplastic combined chemotherapy protocols

– combined modality therapy

– chemotherapy, adjuvant

– electroacupuncture

– neoadjuvant therapy

– photochemotherapy

– radioimmunotherapy

– radiotherapy, adjuvant

– salvage therapy

– complementary therapies

– acupuncture therapy
  – acupressure
  – acupuncture analgesia
  – acupuncture, ear
  – electroacupuncture
  – meridians
  – acupuncture points
  – moxibustion

– anthroposophy

– holistic health

– homeopathy

– medicine, traditional
  – medicine, african traditional
  – medicine, arabic
  – medicine, unani
  – medicine, ayurvedic
  – medicine, kampo
  – medicine, oriental traditional
  – medicine, chinese traditional
  – medicine, kampo
  – medicine, tibetan traditional
  – shamanism

– mind-body and relaxation techniques
  – aromatherapy
  – biofeedback (psychology)
  – breathing exercises
  – hypnosis
  – autogenic training
  – suggestion
  – autosuggestion
  – imagery (psychotherapy)
  – laughter therapy
  – meditation
  – mental healing
  – mind-body relations (metaphysics)
  – psychophysiology
  – relaxation
  – relaxation techniques
  – tai ji
  – therapeutic touch
  – yoga

– musculoskeletal manipulations
  – kinesiology, applied
  – manipulation, chiropractic
  – manipulation, osteopathic
  – manipulation, spinal
  – manipulation, chiropractic
  – massage
  – acupressure
  – myofunctional therapy
  – relaxation techniques

– natural childbirth

– naturopathy

– organotherapy
  – tissue therapy

– phytotherapy
  – aromatherapy
  – eclecticism, historical

– reflexotherapy

– rejuvenation

– sensory art therapies
  – acoustic stimulation
  – aromatherapy
  – art therapy
  – color therapy
  – dance therapy
  – music therapy
  – play therapy
  – psychodrama
  – role playing

– spiritual therapies
  – faith healing
  – homeopathy
  – magic
  – medicine, African traditional
  – meditation
  – mental healing
  – occultism
  – radiesthesia
  – shamanism
  – therapeutic touch
  – witchcraft
  – yoga

– cosmetic techniques

– body modification, non-therapeutic
  – body piercing
  – circumcision
  – circumcision, female
  – tattooing

– chemexfoliation

– dermabrasion

– hair removal

– lipectomy

– mammaplasty
  – breast implantation

– rhinoplasty

– rhytidoplasty

– cryotherapy

– hypothermia, induced
  – gastric hypothermia

– decompression

– lower body negative pressure

– directly observed therapy

– drainage

– drainage, postural

– drug therapy

– antineoplastic protocols
  – antineoplastic combined chemotherapy protocols

– chelation therapy

– chemoprevention
  – antibiotic prophylaxis

– chemotherapy, adjuvant

– chronotherapy

– drug delivery systems
  – delayed-action preparations
  – drug carriers
  – insulin infusion systems
  – vehicles

– drug therapy, combination
  – antineoplastic combined chemotherapy protocols
  – antiretroviral therapy, highly active

– drug therapy, computer-assisted

– enema

– fluid therapy

– home infusion therapy

– hormone replacement therapy
  – estrogen replacement therapy

– medication errors

– orthomolecular therapy

– photochemotherapy

– pleurodesis

– polypharmacy

– premedication
  – antibiotic prophylaxis

– prescriptions, drug

– sclerotherapy

– self administration

– self medication

– thrombolytic therapy
  – hirudin therapy

– electric stimulation therapy

– deep brain stimulation

– electric countershock

– electroacupuncture

– transcutaneous electric nerve stimulation

– emergency treatment

– first aid

– resuscitation
  – cardiopulmonary resuscitation
  – advanced cardiac life support
  – heart massage
  – respiration, artificial
  – resuscitation orders

– transportation of patients

– exercise movement techniques

– breathing exercises

– dance therapy

– drainage, postural

– exercise

– exercise therapy

– relaxation

– relaxation techniques

– tai ji

– walking

– yoga

– feeding methods

– bottle feeding

– enteral nutrition

– parenteral nutrition
  – parenteral nutrition, home
  – parenteral nutrition, home total
  – parenteral nutrition, total
  – parenteral nutrition, home total

– fetal therapies

– blood transfusion, intrauterine

– fetoscopy

– hemodilution

– hemostatic techniques

– balloon occlusion

– embolization, therapeutic
  – chemoembolization, therapeutic

– hemostasis, endoscopic

– hemostasis, surgical

– hydrotherapy

– hygiene

– oral hygiene

– skin care

– hyperthermia, induced

– ammotherapy

– diathermy
  – short-wave therapy
  – ultrasonic therapy
  – ultrasound, high-intensity focused, transrectal

– steam bath

– insufflation

– ischemic preconditioning

– ischemic preconditioning, myocardial

– leeching

– lithotripsy

– lithotripsy, laser

– nutrition therapy

– diet therapy
  – caloric restriction
  – diabetic diet
  – diet, carbohydrate-restricted
  – diet fads
  – diet, fat-restricted
  – diet, protein-restricted
  – diet, reducing
  – diet, sodium-restricted

– nutritional support
  – enteral nutrition
  – parenteral nutrition
  – parenteral nutrition, home
  – parenteral nutrition, home total
  – parenteral nutrition, total
  – parenteral nutrition, home total

– musculoskeletal manipulations

– exercise therapy
  – motion therapy, continuous passive

– kinesiology, applied

– manipulation, chiropractic

– manipulation, orthopedic

– manipulation, osteopathic

– manipulation, spinal
  – manipulation, chiropractic

– massage
  – acupressure

– myofunctional therapy

– orthopedic procedures

– intervertebral disk chemolysis

– orthoptics

– patient care

– aftercare

– ambulatory care
  – peritoneal dialysis, continuous ambulatory

– critical care
  – intensive care
  – intensive care, neonatal

– custodial care

– day care

– episode of care

– foster home care

– hospitalization
  – length of stay
  – patient admission
  – patient discharge
  – patient readmission
  – patient transfer

– institutionalization
  – deinstitutionalization

– life support care

– long-term care

– night care

– nursing care
  – home nursing
  – respite care

– palliative care

– perinatal care

– perioperative care
  – intraoperative care
  – postoperative care

– postnatal care

– preconception care

– prenatal care

– preoperative care

– subacute care

– terminal care
  – euthanasia
  – euthanasia, active
  – euthanasia, active, voluntary
  – euthanasia, animal
  – euthanasia, passive
  – hospice care
  – resuscitation orders
  – suicide, assisted

– withholding treatment
  – euthanasia, passive

– patient isolation

– phototherapy

– color therapy

– heliotherapy

– laser therapy, low-level

– photochemotherapy
  – hematoporphyrin photoradiation

– ultraviolet therapy
  – puva therapy
  – photopheresis

– physical therapy modalities

– balneology
  – ammotherapy
  – baths
  – mud therapy
  – steam bath

– electric stimulation therapy
  – electroacupuncture
  – transcutaneous electric nerve stimulation

– exercise therapy
  – motion therapy, continuous passive

– hydrotherapy

– hyperthermia, induced
  – ammotherapy
  – diathermy
  – short-wave therapy
  – ultrasonic therapy
  – steam bath

– musculoskeletal manipulations
  – manipulation, spinal
  – massage
  – acupressure
  – relaxation techniques

– placebos

– prescriptions, non-drug

– punctures

– body piercing

– paracentesis
  – pericardiocentesis

– phlebotomy
  – bloodletting

– radiotherapy

– brachytherapy

– cranial irradiation
  – pituitary irradiation

– hemibody irradiation

– lymphatic irradiation

– radioimmunotherapy

– radiosurgery

– radiotherapy, adjuvant

– radiotherapy, computer-assisted
  – radiotherapy, conformal
  – radiotherapy, intensity-modulated

– radiotherapy dosage
  – dose fractionation

– radiotherapy, high-energy
  – neutron capture therapy
  – boron neutron capture therapy
  – radioisotope teletherapy

– whole-body irradiation

– x-ray therapy

– physical rehabilitation

– activities of daily living

– art therapy

– bibliotherapy

– dance therapy

– early ambulation

– exercise therapy
  – motion therapy, continuous passive

– music therapy

– occupational therapy

– rehabilitation of hearing impaired
  – communication methods, total
  – lipreading
  – manual communication
  – sign language

– rehabilitation of speech and language disorders
  – language therapy
  – speech, alaryngeal
  – speech, esophageal
  – speech therapy
  – voice training

– rehabilitation, vocational

– rejuvenation

– remission induction

– renal replacement therapy

– renal dialysis
  – hemodiafiltration
  – hemodialysis, home
  – peritoneal dialysis
  – peritoneal dialysis, continuous ambulatory

– hemofiltration
  – hemodiafiltration

– kidney transplantation

– reproductive techniques

– contraception
  – coitus interruptus
  – contraception, barrier
  – contraception, immunologic
  – contraception, postcoital
  – natural family planning methods
  – ovulation inhibition
  – sterilization, reproductive

– fallopian tube patency tests

– insemination, artificial
  – insemination, artificial, heterologous
  – insemination, artificial, homologous

– ovulation detection

– ovulation prediction

– reproductive techniques, assisted
  – embryo transfer
  – fertilization in vitro
  – sperm injections, intracytoplasmic
  – posthumous conception
  – gamete intrafallopian transfer
  – insemination, artificial
  – insemination, artificial, heterologous
  – insemination, artificial, homologous
  – oocyte donation
  – ovulation induction
  – superovulation
  – zygote intrafallopian transfer

– tocolysis

– respiratory therapy

– drainage, postural

– extracorporeal membrane oxygenation

– chest wall oscillation

– oxygen inhalation therapy
  – hyperbaric oxygenation

– respiration, artificial
  – high-frequency ventilation
  – high-frequency jet ventilation
  – liquid ventilation
  – positive-pressure respiration
  – continuous positive airway pressure
  – intermittent positive pressure breathing
  – Intermittent positive pressure ventilation
  – ventilator weaning

– retreatment

– rewarming

– salvage therapy

– self care

– blood glucose self-monitoring

– self administration

– self medication

– sorption detoxification

– enterosorption

– hemofiltration
  – hemodiafiltration

– hemoperfusion

– plasmapheresis

– renal dialysis
  – hemodiafiltration
  – hemodialysis, home
  – peritoneal dialysis
  – peritoneal dialysis, continuous ambulatory

– thalassotherapy

– therapies, investigational

– therapy, computer-assisted

– radiotherapy planning, computer-assisted

– surgery, computer-assisted

The list continues at List of MeSH codes (E03).

E02